The Dondo (also Badondo) are a people of Central Africa. It is a sub-group of the Kongos. They mainly live in the south of the Republic of the Congo, in the north of Angola and in the south-west of the Democratic Republic of the Congo.

References 

This article is based on a translation of the equivalent article of the French Wikipedia

Ethnic groups in the Republic of the Congo
Ethnic groups in the Democratic Republic of the Congo
Ethnic groups in Angola